The 2nd South Carolina String Band is a band of Civil War re-enactors who recreate American popular music of the 1820s to 1860s with authentic instruments and in period style. The group claims to "perform Civil War music as authentically as possible . . . as it truly sounded to the soldiers of the Civil War."

According to the band's official website, the group formed in August 1989. The founding members--consisting of Joe Ewers, Fred Ewers, John Frayler, Dave Goss and Bob Beeman-- were amateurs who played a variety of 19th-century instruments, including banjo, bones, drum, fiddle, guitar, and tambourine. They began by playing informally during re-enactment campaigns. They eventually moved to playing dances and concerts. Today, the roster comprises seven members, including players of the fife, flute, and pennywhistle.

The 2nd South Carolina String Band has released six albums through Palmetto Productions. Documentary filmmaker Ken Burns has featured their music in his films Mark Twain and Jazz. The band appears in the film Gods and Generals, directed by Ronald F. Maxwell, and their music appears on the soundtrack. In November 2004, the band received the Stephen Collins Foster Award for their preservation of 19th-century American song. The band's current personnel includes: Joe Ewers (banjo), Fred Ewers (fiddle), Dave Goss (guitar), Bob Beeman (tambourine & bones), Mike Paul (fiddle), Joe Whitney (flute) and Tom DiGiuseppe (banjo).

Past band members have included Marty Grody (fife, tin whistle), John Frayler (military drum), and Greg Hernandez (fife).

Discography
The Monmouth Tapes (1991)
Southern Soldier (1997)
Hard Road (2001; the best of We're Tenting Tonight (1991) and We are a Band of Brothers (1993))
In High Cotton (2002)
Dulcem Melodies (2006)
Lightning in a Jar [Live] (2008)
Strike the Tent! (album) (2013)
Ain't Dead Yet! (2017)

Videos
The Monmouth Tapes (1991)
Far, far from home (2000)

References

External links   
2nd South Carolina String Band official website

American folk musical groups
Historical reenactment groups
American Civil War reenactment
Musical groups established in 1989